Leucanthiza amphicarpeaefoliella is a moth of the family Gracillariidae. It is known from Ontario and Québec in Canada, and Kentucky, Connecticut, Maryland, Pennsylvania, Vermont, and Illinois in the United States.

The wingspan is about 8 mm.

The larvae feed on Amphicarpaea bracteata. They mine the leaves of their host plant. The mine has the form of a conspicuous white blotch mine on the upperside of the leaf.

References

External links
mothphotographersgroup
Leucanthiza at microleps.org

Lithocolletinae
Moths described in 1859

Moths of North America
Lepidoptera of Canada
Lepidoptera of the United States
Leaf miners
Taxa named by James Brackenridge Clemens